Queen Naija Bulls (born October 17, 1995) is an American singer and media personality. Born in Ypsilanti, Michigan, though she was raised majorly in Detroit, Michigan, she started out her career as a vlogger on YouTube and then participated in season 13 of American Idol. Her self-released song "Medicine" (2017) reached the top 50 of the Billboard Hot 100 in 2018, and she was signed to Capitol Records.

Queen Naija's self-titled EP was released in 2018 and debuted at number 26 on the Billboard 200. Three singles from the album were certified platinum by the RIAA. In 2020, Queen Naija released her debut album Missunderstood, which debuted and peaked at number 9 on the Billboard 200.

Early life 
Queen Naija was born on October 17, 1995, in Ypsilanti, Michigan. She has described her background as a mix of "Arab, Black and Italian", but has also mentioned having Indian ancestry, though she was not sure how much. Her father is from Yemen.

Her birth name, Queen Naija, was given to her by her mother. "Queen" was inspired by her grandmother, who had the same first name, and "Naija" represented her father's name.

Career

2014–2017: American Idol and YouTube 
Queen Naija first gained prominence as a contestant on the thirteenth season of American Idol. She had auditioned two years earlier but had failed to advance into the next round. In the thirteenth season, she advanced into the Hollywood round, but was cut when the top 30 were chosen. Afterwards, Queen Naija went back to working as a security guard. She then continued on building her YouTube career.

2017–2019: Musical career beginnings and Queen Naija EP 
Queen Naija released her song "Medicine" in December 2017 and "Karma", her second single, in June 2018.

Queen Naija did a video interview for the song "Medicine" with Genius in January 2018. Queen documented on her YouTube channel a few meetings with record labels that she attended with her team/management. By March 2018, Queen's initial song post of "Medicine" had more than 10 million views. An official music video was released later that month. The video acquired 4.5 million views on the day of its release, and has over 150+ million views as of December 2019. In July 2018, Queen Naija created a new collaborative YouTube channel, "Royal Family", alongside her new boyfriend, Clarence White. The channel has 2.79 million subscribers as of March 2021.

On April 25, 2018, Queen Naija signed to Capitol Records. On June 28, she released her second single, "Karma". She wrote and recorded the song in January 2018. On the same day, the song reached number one overall on the iTunes charts. "Karma" debuted at number 13 on the Billboard Digital Songs sales chart, and at number 63 on the Billboard Hot 100. The audio for the song has over 116 million views as of March 2021.

Queen Naija released her self-titled extended play on July 27, 2018. It consists of five songs: "Medicine", "Karma", "Mama's Hand", "Butterflies", and "Bad Boy". The project includes production from No I.D., El Jefe, Rob Grimaldi, 30 Hertz Beats, and ClickNPress. Queen described the EP as an emotional journey in which each song describes either an experience or emotion she has gone through. The songs reference topics including heartbreak and betrayal, motherhood, and finding new love again. "Medicine" deals with her heartbreak and emotions toward her ex-partner, and "Karma" explains overcoming the heartbreak while sending a message that she will be fine. "Mama's Hand" is dedicated to her son; she promises to give him everything and encourages him to have optimistic thoughts about the future. "Butterflies" reveals that she is beginning to fall in love again with someone new. "Bad Boy" describes her connection with a new lover, and how her goodness may cause him to change for the better. The EP debuted at number 26 on the Billboard 200 and reached number one on the Apple Music R&B charts.

2020–present: Missunderstood 

On July 24, 2020, Queen Naija released "Pack Lite", the first single for her debut album. A video for the song was released on July 31. Queen released the single "Lie to Me" featuring Lil Durk on October 2. On October 5, Queen released a visual for the song. The song samples DeBarge's "A Dream". On October 30, Queen Naija released her debut album, Missunderstood. The album is 18 tracks long and features artists such as Jacquees, Toosii, Mulatto, Pretty Vee, Russ, Lucky Daye, Kiana Ledé, and more. Three singles from the album were Certified Gold by the RIAA. The deluxe edition of the album titled Missunderstood...Still featuring J.I the Prince of N.Y and Ari Lennox was released on April 16, 2021. On October 28, 2021, Missunderstood was nominated at the 2021 American Music Awards. On October 17, 2021, on Queen's 26th birthday, she started the mini Butterfly Tour, her second tour, across 19 US cities, with special guest Tink.

Discography

Studio albums

Extended plays

Singles

Notes

References

External links 

Official website

1995 births
Living people
21st-century African-American women singers
American people of Yemeni descent
People from Ypsilanti, Michigan
African-American women singer-songwriters
Singers from Detroit
American contemporary R&B singers
Singer-songwriters from Michigan
American people of Italian descent
American people of Indian descent